Bodyguard is an 2016 Iranian film about a middle-aged man who protects high-ranking political figures in Iran. It is written and directed  by Iranian film director Ebrahim Hatamikia. The film was first shown in the 34th Fajr International Film Festival. Parviz Parastoui, Merila Zarei, and Babak Hamidian star in the movie. It is produced by Ehsan Muhammad Hasani.

Synopsis
Bodyguard is the story of a middle-aged man who protects high-ranking political figures. However, he gets into trouble when a suicide bomber wearing an explosive vest approaches the vice president. The director of the film stated "some motifs in Bodyguard to recollect his 1999 hit The Glass Agency."

Cast
 Parviz Parastoui
 Merila Zarei
 Babak Hamidian
 Mahmud Azizi
 Amir Aghaei
 Farhad Ghaemian
 Diba Zahedi
 Pedram Sharifi
 Kamran Najafzadeh

Awards and nominations

The film awards in the 34th Fajr International Film Festival include: 

The film nominated in four categories at Madrid International Film Festival:

At the 2nd Vienna Independent Film Festival the film won the following awards:

References

External links
 Bodyguard website 
 
 

2016 films
Films directed by Ebrahim Hatamikia
Iranian action films
Films set in Iran
Films about bodyguards